Jimmy Roye (born 8 September 1988) is a French professional footballer who plays as an attacking midfielder for  club Laval. He has previously played for Amiens, Calais, Chamois Niortais, Paris, Gazélec Ajaccio and Red Star.

Career statistics

Honours 
Laval

 Championnat National: 2021–22

References

External links
 Jimmy Roye profile at foot-national.com
 
 

1988 births
Living people
Footballers from Paris
French footballers
Association football midfielders
OGC Nice players
Amiens SC players
Calais RUFC players
Paris FC players
Chamois Niortais F.C. players
Red Star F.C. players
Stade Lavallois players
Ligue 2 players
Championnat National players